The 2017 Claro Open Floridablanca was a professional tennis tournament played on clay courts. It was the ninth edition of the tournament which was part of the 2017 ATP Challenger Tour. It took place in Floridablanca, Colombia between 7 – 12 August 2017.

Singles main-draw entrants

Seeds

 1 Rankings are as of 31 July 2017.

Other entrants
The following players received wildcards into the singles main draw:
  Charles Force
  Felipe Ramírez Luna
  Carlos Salamanca
  Pedro Uribe

The following players received entry from the qualifying draw:
  Oscar José Gutierrez
  Gonzalo Lama
  Juan Ignacio Londero
  Camilo Ugo Carabelli

Champions

Singles

 Guido Pella def.  Facundo Argüello 6–2, 6–4.

Doubles

 Sergio Galdós /  Nicolás Jarry def.  Sekou Bangoura /  Evan King 6–3, 5–7, [10–1].

External links
Official Website

2017 ATP Challenger Tour
2017
2017 in Colombian tennis